Earnest Woodall (born July 24, 1959) is an American composer. Born in Bay Shore, New York and raised in suburban Long Island, New York, Woodall took up the guitar at age 10, inspired by rock, blues and jazz players. A local teacher Peter Rogine introduced him to the music of Philip Glass, Steve Reich and John Adams, as well as Miles Davis, John Coltrane, and Thelonious Monk and coming of age with the progressive music of Yes, Emerson, Lake & Palmer, and Pink Floyd which sparked a lifelong love of both 20th-century classical music, progressive rock and jazz. Earnest Woodall soon attended the Five Towns College of Music and then the Berklee College of Music, later moving into the local music scene of the New York Tri-State area with a wide variety of bandleaders and musicians.

Establishing himself as a rare artist that can play more than one style of music with true fluency, virtuosity and sincerity. Earnest Woodall proves it on his 2004 Zephyrwood Music release, Time to Think. The album finds him confirming his reputation as an original and innovative composer / performer.

As well as recording his own music Woodall also composed and recorded music for many independent films from 1992–2000 and also has received two Meet the Composer grants from the National Endowment for the Arts (NEA) Composers Program

In the late 1980s and early 1990s, Woodall found himself in the
center of the cassette tape underground culture and was reviewed by the most popular underground music zines of the time such as Option, Fact-Sheet Five, Tape Op, Ear, Wired, The Improviser, New Music Journal, See-Hear, and Creative Alternative.

Woodall also pulls a lot of influence from the eclectic randomness of Frank Zappa and the sounds produced by various progressive rock bands such as early Genesis, Peter Gabriel, Yes, and King Crimson.

Reviews 
This section is being revised as not to violate any copyright.

Discography

Composition work

Guitar work

See also
Minimalist music
Steve Reich
John Adams
Philip Glass
Kronos Quartet

External links

Official site
 Official website

Other sites
 

1959 births
American male composers
21st-century American composers
Living people
People from Bay Shore, New York
People from Commack, New York
21st-century American male musicians
Cassette culture 1970s–1990s